Nicolaus Mac Cathasaigh was a priest in Ireland during the 14th century.

The Archdeacon of Clogher, in 1320 he became Bishop of Clogher. He died in 1356.

References

14th-century Roman Catholic bishops in Ireland
Pre-Reformation bishops of Clogher
Archdeacons of Clogher
1356 deaths
Year of birth unknown